Poch'ŏn Ch'ŏngnyŏn station (former Karim station) is a railway station in Kasal-li, Poch'ŏn county, Ryanggang province, North Korea, on the Samjiyŏn of the Korean State Railway. It is also the starting point of the narrow-gauge Poch'ŏn line.

History
The station, along with the rest of the Samjiyŏn Line, was opened by the Korean State Railway in 1948. Extensive flooding in 1994 led to the closure of the line, and the station has since been out of use.

References

Railway stations in North Korea